Sufficiency of disclosure or enablement is a patent law requirement that a patent application disclose a claimed invention in sufficient detail so that the person skilled in the art could carry out that claimed invention. The requirement is fundamental to patent law: a monopoly is granted for a given period of time in exchange for a disclosure to the public how to make or practice the invention.

Background
The disclosure requirement lies at the heart and origin of patent law. An inventor, or the inventor's assignee, is granted a monopoly for a given period of time in exchange for the inventor disclosing to the public how to make or practice their invention. If a patent fails to contain such information, then the bargain is violated, and the patent is unenforceable or can be revoked.

Jurisdictions

Europe

Article 83 of the European Patent Convention states that an application must disclose the invention in a manner sufficiently clear and complete for it to be carried out by a person skilled in the art.  Sufficiency is considered by the examiner during examination of a patent application and the requirement of Article 83 must be complied with in order for a patent to be granted.  Insufficient disclosure is also a ground for opposition under .

For instance, an insufficiency of disclosure might arise if references to standardisation documents are provided to support essential aspects of the invention, but if these references are not sufficiently precise so that "the skilled person would have to make ... undue efforts to find and get together the information it needs to carry out the invention".

Insufficiency is also a ground for revocation under Section 72 of the UK Patents Act.

United States

Undue experimentation 
Under the patent law in the United States, the patent specification must be complete enough so that a person of "ordinary skill in the art" of the invention can make and use the invention without “undue experimentation". There is no precise definition of "undue experimentation". The standard is determined based on the art of the invention.

In the "predictable arts", such as mechanical inventions and software inventions, very little description is required.  A mere flow chart of a piece of software, for example, is adequate.  Source code is not normally required. In the “unpredictable arts”, such as chemistry and pharmaceuticals, a very complete description is required.

In a 2005 U.S. court case, several of Jerome H. Lemelson patents covering bar code readers were held to be invalid because the specification was not complete enough for a person of ordinary skill in the art of electrical engineering to have made and used the claimed invention at the time the patent was filed (1954) without undue experimentation.  In this case the court held that a person of ordinary skill in the art was a degreed electrical engineer with two years of experience as of the filing date of the original patent application, 1954.  One of the challenges of this court case, which was decided in 2005, was to find experts on the state of the art who were alive in 1954.

Best mode 

In the United States, the sufficiency of disclosure requirement is complemented by an additional requirement, generally not found in other national patent jurisdictions: the "best mode requirement". According to the requirement, the disclosure must also contain the inventor's "best mode" of making or practising the invention. For example, if an inventor knows that a liquid should be heated to 250 degrees for optimal performance, but discloses in the patent that the liquid should be heated to "above 200 degrees", then the inventor has not disclosed his "best mode" for carrying out the invention. The best mode must be disclosed for the entire invention, and not only its innovative aspects.

The purpose of the “best mode” requirement is to ensure full disclosure, such that the inventor may not “disclose only what he knows to be his second-best embodiment, retaining the best for himself.”

The "best mode requirement" only applies to what the inventor knows at the time the application is filed, not to what is subsequently discovered.

Post-AIA, US law no longer permits invalidation of a US patent for failure to disclose the best mode, although technically the best mode is still required to be disclosed by the language of 35 U.S.C. Section 112.

Enablement 

The patent law in the United States requires, among other things, that the patent specification "contain a written description of the invention, and of the manner and process of making and using it, in such full, clear, concise, and exact terms as to enable any person skilled in the art to which it pertains, or with which it is most nearly connected, to make and use the same."  35 U.S.C. 112(1).
The requirement "to enable" a person of ordinary skill in the art to make and use the invention is colloquially referred to as the "enablement" requirement. It is a key part of the patent "bargain"--an inventor gets a monopoly in return for teaching the world about their invention. A patentee who claims more than they enable is not holding up their side of the bargain: they are taking advantage of patent law's monopoly while keeping their invention secret.

A patent "enables" the invention if it allows a person of ordinary skill in the art to practice the invention. Patents may fail this test if they claim more than they teach--for example, a patent that claims all light bulbs but that only explains how to make a particular type of light bulb.

But what if some experimentation is required to practice the invention? This can be allowed as long as the experimentation is "reasonable." Some experimentation is often required in biochemistry and AI, for example. The US "In re Wands" case and MPEP 2164.01(a) teach that this can vary depending on the situation.

A patent that does not meet the enablement requirement may be declared invalid in whole or in part by a court or upon re-exam. Enablement is determined as of the filing date of the patent, and patent-owners cannot use experiments conducted post-application to establish the validity of their patents.

Inventors who do not wish to teach the world about their invention still have some protection under trade secret law, which protects valuable secrets from being misappropriated through unfair means (such as theft or industrial espionage). But unless inventors apply for a valid, enabling patent, they cannot take advantage of patent law's monopoly rights, and thus cannot stop competitors from developing the same product or process through proper means (such as independent invention or reverse engineering). Enablement is the price an inventor pays for this stronger protection.

Written description and possession 

In the United States, the would-be patentee must provide a "written description" of the invention, sufficient to demonstrate that they actually possessed the invention at the time of filing. "Written description" determines the scope of claims.

The purpose of this rule is to avoid applicants speculatively filing for patents for inventions that they have not yet invented in order to get priority over competitors. As the Federal Circuit explained in Amgen Inc. v. Hoechst Marion Roussel, Inc. 314 F.3d 1313, 1330 (Fed. Cir. 2003), "[t]he purpose of the written description requirement is to prevent an applicant from later asserting that he invented that which he did not." 

Without the written description/sufficiency of disclosure requirement, an applicant might delay scientific and technical progress by blocking competitors from inventing something that the applicant has not yet invented. The written description requirement thus reinforces the idea that patents are a reward for inventing by requiring the applicant to show they possess the invention.

See also 
 Incredible utility
 Reduction to practice
 Sufficiency of disclosure in Canadian patent law

References

Further reading 
 Matthew J. Dowd, Nancy J. Leith and Jeffrey S. Weaver, Nanotechnology and the Best Mode, Nanotechnology Law & Business, September 2005  (pdf file)
 Steven B. Walmsley, Best Mode: A Plea to Repair or Sacrifice This Broken Requirement of United States Patent Law, 9 Mich. Telecomm. Tech. L. Rev. 125 (2002), available at http://www.mttlr.org/volnine/walmsley.pdf

External links
 : The Description (in the Patent Cooperation Treaty)
 : Disclosure of the invention (in the European Patent Convention)
 35 U.S.C. § 112: Specification (in the United States Code)

Patent law